Central Plaza Rama III is a shopping center located on Ratchadapisek Road in Yan Nawa District, Bangkok, Thailand. The mall opened in 1997 and is one of Central Group's largest shopping centers.

Overview 
The shopping center has a total of nine floors with two basement floors included. The shopping center provides a mix of retail shops, a Central Department store, a food court, a Major Cineplex (9-screen cinema), and a retail arcade.

Anchors 
 Central Department Store
 Tops
 Major Cineplex 9 Cinemas
 B2S Think Space
 Supersports
 Power Buy
 Food Patio

Parking
The shopping center has a carpark with parking spaces for approximately 2,340 cars.

See also 
 List of shopping malls in Thailand

External links 
 Central Group website

Notes

References 
 
 

Shopping malls in Bangkok
Central Pattana
Yan Nawa district
Shopping malls established in 1997
1997 establishments in Thailand